Zhuravlev Bay (Zaliv Zhuravleva), is a bay in Severnaya Zemlya, Krasnoyarsk Krai, Russia. This bay is blocked by ice most of the year.

History
This bay was named by the 1930–1932 expedition to the archipelago led by Georgy Ushakov and Nikolay Urvantsev after Soviet Arctic explorer, invaluable member of the expedition and veteran surveyor Sergei Prokopyevich Zhuravlev (1892–1937).

Geography
Zhuravlev Bay is a body of water in the northeastern area of Komsomolets Island, the northernmost island of Severnaya Zemlya.

The bay is open to the Kara Sea in the southwest. The edge of the massive Academy of Sciences Glacier runs all along the eastern shore, while the northwestern shoreline is bound by a stretch of unglaciated area with Shar Island,  in diameter, at the end of the headland.

Further reading
Два года на северной земле (Two years in Severnaya Zemlya)

See also
List of fjords of Russia

References

External links

Журавлев Сергей Прокопьевич (08(20).10.1892–26.11.1937)
Polarpost - Журавлев Сергей Прокопьевич (1892–1937)
Eurasian Arctic Tectonics - DiVA

Bays of Severnaya Zemlya
Bays of the Kara Sea